Welsh Romani (or Welsh Kalá) is a variety of the Romani language which was spoken fluently in Wales until at least 1950. It was spoken by the Kale group of the Romani people who arrived in Britain during the 16th century. The first record of Romani moving permanently into Wales comes from the 18th century. Welsh-Romani is one of the many Northern Romani dialects.

The majority of the vocabulary is of Romani origin but there are a number of loanwords from other languages. Welsh loanwords include melanō ("yellow", from melyn), grīga ("heather", from grug) and kraŋka ("crab", from cranc). There are also English loanwords such as vlija ("village"), spīdra ("spider") and bråmla ("bramble").

Historically the variants of Welsh Kalá and Angloromani (Spoken by the Romanichal of England) constituted the same variant of Romani, known as British Romani. Welsh Kalá is closely related to Angloromani (Spoken by Romanichal in England), Scandoromani (Spoken by Romanisæl in Norway and Sweden), Scottish Cant (Spoken by Scottish Lowland Romani in Lowland Scotland) and Finnish Kalo (Spoken by Finnish Kale in Finland). Welsh Kale, English Romanichal, Norwegian and Swedish Romanisæl, Finnish Kale and Scottish Lowland Romani are closely related groups and are descended from the wave of Romani immigrants who came to England in the 16th century.

References

External links
Welsh romani within Britain
 Welsh Romani word list
Romani Cymru

Northern Romani dialects
Welsh language
Languages of Wales
Languages of the United Kingdom
Romani in Wales